Giovanni De Vivo (24 March 1940 – 20 September 2015) was an Italian Roman Catholic bishop.

He was born in Siena and ordained a priest in 1964. De Vivo was named bishop of Pescia in December 1993 and ordained in 1994 by bishop Francesco Niccoli. He died still in office in 2015.

References

1940 births
2015 deaths
People from Siena
21st-century Italian Roman Catholic bishops
20th-century Italian Roman Catholic bishops